The 2016 season Independiente Participate in the Primera División and the Copa Argentina.

Club

Kits
 Supplier: Puma SE
 Main Sponsor::  Correo OCA /  
 Secondary Sponsor:  Audifarm Salud

Squad information

Current coaching staff

{|class="wikitable"
|+
! style="background-color:white; color:black;" scope="col"|Position
! style="background-color:white; color:black;" scope="col"|Staff
|-

Transfers

Player In

Total spending:  15,320,000 $

Player Out 

Total Income : 5,400,000 $

Players out on loan 

Net income:  9,920,000 $

Pre-season

Copa De Oro

Copa De Avellaneda

Friendly

Summer

Winter

Competitions

Overall

Overview

Updated as of 31 May 2016

Primera División

League table

Relegation

Results summary

Results by round

Copa Argentina

Round of 64

Round of 32

Statistics

Squad statistics

Last updated on 24 March 2016

Goals

Last updated on 20 May 2016

Assists

Last updated on 20 May 2016

Clean sheets

Last updated on 20 May 2016

Disciplinary record

Last updated on 11 May 2016

Penalties

Last updated on 24 March 2016

Overall

Last updated on 20 May 2016

References

External links
 Club Atlético Independiente|Independiente official web site 

Ind
Club Atlético Independiente seasons